Igor Aramovich Ter-Ovanesyan (born 19 May 1938) is a Ukrainian former competitor and coach in the long jump. Competing for the Soviet Union, he was a five-time European and two-time Olympic medalist in this event. In 1985 he was awarded the Order of the Badge of Honour.

Early life
Ter-Ovanesyan was born in Kyiv to an Armenian discus thrower, Aram Avetisovich Ter-Ovanesyan, and a Ukrainian volleyball player, Valentina Ilinskaya. His parents met at the Kyiv State Institute of Physical Education, where they both taught sports-related topics.

Career 
Ter-Ovanesyan took up athletics when he was 15, and within two years was included to the Soviet national team. Ter-Ovanesyan trained at Burevestnik, first in Kiev, later in Lviv, and then in Moscow. He holds a PhD and a title of Professor at the Department of Athletics, Moscow State Academy of Physical Culture. He published several sports-related books in Russian.

Ter-Ovanesyan won Olympic bronze medals at the 1960 Summer Olympics in Rome – with a jump of 8.04 meters – and at the 1964 Summer Olympics in Tokyo – with a jump of 7.99 meters. He also competed at the 1956, 1968 and 1972 Olympics and finished fourth in 1968. At the European Championships he won outdoor gold medals in 1958, 1962 and 1969, and an indoor silver medal in 1971. Ter-Ovanesyan became the first European long jumper to break the 8 meter barrier. He broke the European long jump record eight times and the world long jump record twice. In 1963, he won the United States Indoor Championships. Ter-Ovanesyan had the annual world's best long jumps in 1962, 1966, 1967 and 1969.

After retiring from competitions, Ter-Ovanesyan became a national coach. His pupils included Ineta Radēviča, Valery Podluzhny, Vilma Bardauskienė and Tatyana Kolpakova. In 1983–1989 he headed the Soviet track and field team (with a help of state-sponsored steroid program).

In February 2017, Ter-Ovanesyan held a press conference in Moscow, during which he said that East German successes due to state-sponsored doping are legitimate results of "good pharmacology" and should not be condemned.

Results

Olympics
 1960 Rome: Bronze with 8.04 m behind Ralph Boston (USA) with 8.12 m and Bo Roberson (USA) with 8.11 m.
 1964 Tokyo: Bronze with 7.99 m behind Great Britain's Lynn Davies with 8.07 m and Ralph Boston (USA) with 8.03 m
 1968 Mexico: Fourth with 8.12 m behind Bob Beamon (USA) with 8.90 m, Klaus Beer (GDR) with 8.19 m and Ralph Boston (USA) with 8.16 m.

European Championships
 1958 Stockholm: Gold with 7.81 m before Kazimierz Kropidłowski with 7.67 m and Henryk Grabowski with 7.51 m .
 1962 Belgrade: Gold with 8.19 m before Rainer Stenius and Pentti Eskola, both with 7.85 m
 1966 Budapest: Silver with 7.88 m behind Lynn Davies with 7.98 m and before Jean Cochard with 7.88 m
 1969 Athens: Gold with 8.17 m before Lynn Davies with 8.07 m and Tõnu Lepik with 8.04 m
 1971 Helsinki: Silver with 7.91 m behind Max Klauss with 7.92 m and before Stanisław Szudrowicz with 7.87 m

World records
8.31 metres on 10 July 1962 in Yerevan
8.35 metres on 19 October 1967 in Mexico City

Defection target
On the eve of the Rome Olympics, athlete Dave Sime of the USA was approached by the Central Intelligence Agency and recruited to help secure Ter-Ovanesyan's defection. Sime approached Ter-Ovanesyan and introduced him to a CIA agent in Rome, but that agent's manner frightened Ter-Ovanesyan off and he did not defect.

Personal life
Ter-Ovanesyan has been married twice. His first marriage was to Margarita Yurievna Yemelyanova. They had a son, Igor (b. 1963), and a daughter, Karen (b. 1967). His second marriage was to Olga Arturovna Klein. In 1982, they had a daughter, Jana Igorevna Klein.

Notes

References
 
 Maraniss, David (2008). Rome 1960: The Olympics That Changed the World. New York, Simon & Schuster. .

1938 births
Living people
Sportspeople from Kyiv
Ukrainian male long jumpers
Soviet male long jumpers
Soviet athletics coaches
Ukrainian athletics coaches
Olympic male long jumpers
Olympic athletes of the Soviet Union
Olympic bronze medalists for the Soviet Union
Olympic bronze medalists in athletics (track and field)
Athletes (track and field) at the 1956 Summer Olympics
Athletes (track and field) at the 1960 Summer Olympics
Athletes (track and field) at the 1964 Summer Olympics
Athletes (track and field) at the 1968 Summer Olympics
Athletes (track and field) at the 1972 Summer Olympics
Medalists at the 1960 Summer Olympics
Medalists at the 1964 Summer Olympics
Universiade medalists in athletics (track and field)
Universiade gold medalists for the Soviet Union
Medalists at the 1961 Summer Universiade
Medalists at the 1963 Summer Universiade
Medalists at the 1965 Summer Universiade
European Athletics Championships medalists
Japan Championships in Athletics winners
World record setters in athletics (track and field)
Burevestnik (sports society) athletes
Honoured Masters of Sport of the USSR
Russian people of Armenian descent
Ukrainian people of Armenian descent
Soviet Armenians